Mike Anderson may refer to:

Mike Anderson (running back) (born 1973), American football player
Mike Anderson (linebacker) (born 1949), former American football player
Mike Anderson (offensive lineman) (born 1961), Canadian football
Mike Anderson (basketball coach) (born 1959), basketball coach
Mike Anderson (basketball, born 1986), basketball player
Mike Anderson (outfielder) (born 1951), major league outfielder 
Mike Anderson (pitcher) (born 1966), major league pitcher
Mike Anderson (baseball coach) (born 1965), college baseball coach
Mike Anderson (curler) (born 1985), Canadian curler
Mike B. Anderson (born 1973), American television and film director for The Simpsons
 Mikey Anderson, American ice hockey player
Cornealious Michael Anderson III (born 1977), reformed criminal

See also
Michael Anderson (disambiguation)